Noelle or Noëlle is the feminine form of the gender neutral name Noel.  It derives from the old French Noël, "Christmas," a variant (and later a replacement) of nael, which itself derives from the Latin natalis, "birthday". Other nicknames and variations for girls named Noelle include Noèle, Noelia, Noeline, Noela, Noell, Noella, Noelene, and Noeleen.

Given name
People with the name include:

Noelle
 Noelle Barahona (born 1990), Chilean alpine skier
 Noelle Barker (1928–2013), British soprano singer and singing teacher
 Noelle Bassi (born 1983), American butterfly swimmer
 Noelle Beck (born 1968), American actress
 Noelle Freeman (born 1989), American beauty pageant titleholder
 Noele Gordon (1919-1985), British Actress
 Noelle Kennedy, Irish camogie player
 Noelle Keselica (born 1984), American soccer forward
 Noelle Kocot, American poet
 Noelle Lenihan (born 1999), Irish paralympic discus thrower
 Noelle Maritz (born 1995), Swiss football defender
 Noelle Middleton (1926–2016), Irish actress
 Noelle Montcalm (born 1988), Canadian athlete specialising in the 400 metres hurdles
 Noelle Murray (born 1989), Irish footballer
 Noelle Pikus-Pace (born 1982), American skeleton racer
 Noelle Quinn (born 1985), American basketball player
 Noelle Reno (born 1983), American fashion entrepreneur, television presenter, socialite, and model
 Noelle Sabbe, French racing cyclist
 Noelle Sandwith (1927–2006), English artist
 Noelle Scaggs (born 1979), American singer-songwriter
 Noelle Valdivia, American television writer and playwright
 Noelle Vial (1959–2003), Irish poet

Noëlle
 Noëlle Boisson (born 1944), French film editor
 Noëlle Châtelet (born 1944), French writer and lecturer 
 Noëlle Cordier (born 1944), French singer
 Noëlle Lenoir (born 1948), French stateswoman
 Noëlle Norman (1921–1985), French film actress
 Noëlle van Lottum (born 1972), Dutch tennis player

Fictional characters
 Noelle Holiday, a main character in the video game Deltarune
 Noelle Silva, a character in the manga series Black Clover
 Noelle, a playable character in the video game Genshin Impact

Surname
 Amanda Noelle (born 1983), American Christian musician and worship leader
 Nica Noelle, American entrepreneur, pornographic film actress and director

See also
 Noel (given name)
 Noelia (disambiguation)
 Noell (disambiguation)
 Marie-Noëlle
Noella

References

French feminine given names
Surnames
English feminine given names
Given names